The Sherman E. Smith Training Center is an on-campus athletic training facility built on the campus of Oklahoma State University in Stillwater, Oklahoma.

The facility is named after Oklahoma State alumnus Sherman Smith, whose father founded Service Drilling Company of Tulsa and friend and former business partner of T. Boone Pickens. Smith donated $20 million to the Oklahoma State University athletics department to endow the maintenance and general upkeep of the facility. It is believed that the construction costs for the Training Center will be at least partially financed through the funds donated by Boone Pickens in early 2006.

The facility cost $19 million. The Training Center is capable of allowing indoor practices for several sports, including football, soccer, baseball, softball, and track & field. Three additional football practice fields, one astroturf with a north/south orientation and two natural grass surfaces, one north/south the other east/west are directly east Training Center. The Smith Training Center is built north of Hall of Fame Avenue, directly across from Boone Pickens Stadium.

Not wanting a simple inflatable practice "bubble" or a stark and sterile facility more resembling an aircraft hangar than a building on a major university campus, Oklahoma State officials wanted a modern training facility that's as aesthetically pleasing as it is functional. The Center will blend seamlessly with Boone Pickens Stadium, Gallagher-Iba Arena, and the rest of the OSU campus with its modified Georgian architecture.

The area of  makes the Center one of the largest facility of its kind in the Big 12 Conference, equal with the current mark of  held by Iowa State University's Bergstrom Indoor Practice Facility. The Center's expansive area is large enough for an indoor playing surface large enough to accommodate regulation football and soccer fields. Another indoor facility designed specifically for the Oklahoma State track and field program is expected to be built in the coming years.

External links
 Oklahoma State University Athletics site

Oklahoma State Cowboys football
Sports venues in Oklahoma
Buildings and structures in Stillwater, Oklahoma
2013 establishments in Oklahoma
Sports venues completed in 2013
American football venues in Oklahoma
Oklahoma State Cowboys and Cowgirls soccer
Soccer venues in Oklahoma